Alikovsky District (Elĕk rayonĕ) is an administrative and municipal district (raion), one of the twenty-one in the Chuvash Republic, Russia. It is located in the northwestern central part of the republic and borders with Morgaushsky and Yadrinsky Districts in the north, Krasnoarmeysky District in the east, Vurnarsky and Shumerlinsky Districts in the south, and with Krasnochetaysky District in the west. Its administrative center is the rural locality (a selo) of Alikovo. Population:  The population of Alikovo accounts for 14.5% of the district's total population.

History
The district was formed on October 1, 1927.

Economy
There is a construction plant in Alikovo.

Transportation
The Cheboksary–Yadrin and the Cheboksary–Krasnye Chetay autoroute cross the territory of the district.

Demographics
As of the 2010 Census, 97.55% of the raion's population was ethnically Chuvash, 1.76% of the population was ethnically Russian, and the remaining 0.69% of the population was from other ethnic groups.

Education
There is a middle school in Alikovo.

Culture
There is the Alikovo District Literary and Local Lore Museum, a people's theater, a folk band, a veteran's orchestra, a school's brass band, and a chorus. Regional Chuvash music festival "Vir'yal shevlisem" (lit. Viryal's pancakes) takes place in May of each year.

Notable people
Alexander Artemiev, writer and poet
Anatoly Serep, writer and poet
Arcady Aris, writer
Arkady Malov, poet and translator
Boris Markov, actor, director
Gerasim Pileš, writer and playwright
Ille Toktash, writer and poet
Nikita Larionov, writer and poet
Nikolai Yut, writer, folklorist, and literature critic
Stanislav Voronov, artist

Further reading
L. A. Yefimov, "Alikovsky District" ("Элӗк Енӗ"), Alikovo, 1994.
"Аликовская энциклопедия" (Alikovsky District's Encyclopedia), authors: Yefimov L.A., Yefimov E.L., Ananyev A.A., Terentyev G.K., Cheboksary, 2009, .

References

Notes

Sources

 
Districts of Chuvashia